The Sanjak of Görice or Korçë was a second-level administrative unit (sanjak) of the Ottoman Empire centred in Korçë. It was established in the 15th century following Ottoman conquests and disestablished during the Balkan Wars (1912–13). It was one of several sanjaks part of the Manastir Vilayet (1874–1912). It had territory in what is today southeastern Albania and northwestern Greece.

Sub-districts
The sub-districts (kaza) of the sanjak were:
Görice (Korçë)
İstarova (Pogradec)
Kolonya (Ersekë)
Kesriye (Kastoria)

Demographics

1897
According to Russian consul in the Manastir Vilayet, A. Rostkovski, finishing the statistical article in 1897, the total population of the sanjak was 175,702. Albanians were 113,303 (81,262 Muslims and 32,035 Christians) and Slavs were 38,235 (30,008 Patriarchists and 8,227 Exarchists). In Kastoria there were 9,549 Greek Christians and 294 Greek Muslims. Vlachs (Aromanians) were 9,377 (3,297 in Korçë and 6,080 in Kastoria).

References

Further reading

External links

Görice
Ottoman Albania
Ottoman Greece
15th-century establishments in the Ottoman Empire
1912 disestablishments in the Ottoman Empire